The Quetta Press Club is a press club in Quetta, Pakistan.

See also
 Karachi Press Club
 Lahore Press Club
 Peshawar Press Club

References

BUJ

Press clubs
Mass media in Balochistan, Pakistan
Mass media in Quetta
Pakistani journalism organisations